NCHC may refer to:

 National Coalition on Health Care
 National Collegiate Honors Council
 National Center for High-Performance Computing
 National Collegiate Hockey Conference
 National Clogging and Hoedown Council